Thomas Arthur VC (1835 – 2 March 1902) was a British Army soldier and recipient of the Victoria Cross, the highest award for gallantry in the face of the enemy that can be awarded to British and Commonwealth forces.

Victoria Cross action
Arthur was approximately 20 years old, and a gunner and driver in the Royal Regiment of Artillery during the Crimean War when the following deed took place for which he was awarded the VC.

On 7 June 1855 at Sebastopol, Crimea, Gunner Arthur was in charge of the magazine in one of the left advanced batteries of the right attack, when the Quarries were taken. On his own initiative he carried barrels of infantry ammunition for the 7th Fusiliers several times during the evening, across the open. He volunteered for and formed one of the spiking party of artillery at the assault on the Redan on 18 June 1855 and on numerous occasions left the trenches to bring in wounded officers and men.

His Victoria Cross is displayed at the Royal Artillery Museum, Woolwich, London.

References

External links
 
 

British recipients of the Victoria Cross
Crimean War recipients of the Victoria Cross
British Army personnel of the Crimean War
Royal Artillery soldiers
Burials in Wiltshire
People from Torridge District
1835 births
1902 deaths
British Army recipients of the Victoria Cross
Military personnel from Devon